The 13th Parliament of Antigua and Barbuda was elected on 12 March 2009.

As of April 8, 2022, it is the most recent parliament that has had a UPP majority.

Members

Senate

Changes to Senate during session

House of Representatives

References 

Parliaments of Antigua and Barbuda